Divine Lust is a Broadway musical created by and featuring Damian Perkins and Glenda Benevides.

External links
Divine Lust - a musical created by Damian Perkins and Glenda Benevides

Broadway musicals